Irvin Acie Cross (July 27, 1939 – February 28, 2021) was an American professional football player and sportscaster. He played cornerback in the National Football League (NFL) and was a two-time Pro Bowl selection with the Philadelphia Eagles. Working with CBS, Cross was the first African-American sports analyst on national television. He was an initial co-host of The NFL Today, which became the pregame show standard for all television networks.

After playing college football for the Northwestern Wildcats, Cross was selected by Philadelphia in the seventh round of the 1961 NFL Draft. He played six of his nine NFL seasons with the Eagles. He was traded to the Los Angeles Rams and played there for three seasons before returning to the Eagles and finishing his playing career. While he was playing, Cross was also a radio and TV sports reporter in Philadelphia. He joined CBS in 1971, where he worked until 1994. The Pro Football Hall of Fame awarded him the Pete Rozelle Radio-Television Award in 2009, becoming the first black person to receive the award. He was also an athletic director at Idaho State University and Macalester College.

Early life
Cross was born in Hammond, Indiana, as the eighth of 15 children. He attended Hammond High, where he played football and basketball and was also a track athlete. The Times named him the 1957 Male Athlete of the Year.  He was inducted into the Hammond Sports Hall of Fame.

College career
Cross graduated with a bachelor of science degree from Northwestern University School of Education and Social Policy in 1961, the same graduating class as future broadcasting colleague Brent Musburger. He was part of Ara Parseghian's first recruiting class with the Wildcats. A three-year football letterman from 1958 through 1960, Cross played wide receiver, defensive back, and defensive end for Northwestern. He was a team captain and an honorable-mention all-conference selection in the Big Ten in 1960. He also starred in track and was honored as the university's Male Athlete of the Year as a senior.

Professional football career
Cross was selected by the Philadelphia Eagles in the seventh round (98th overall) of the 1961 NFL Draft. He was one of the first African-American starters for the franchise. After beginning his rookie year in 1961 as third string, he became the Eagles starting right cornerback eight games into the season after a broken leg ended Tom Brookshier's career. Cross suffered numerous concussions that year, prompting his teammates to call him "Paper Head". The most severe was in Pittsburgh, when he was unconscious after blocking on a punt return for Timmy Brown. He spent three nights in a hospital. The team doctor said that a major hit to the head could be fatal if he returned too soon. To protect himself, Cross had a helmet with extra padding made. "I just tried to keep my head out of the way while making tackles, but that's just the way it was. Most of the time, they gave you some smelling salts and you went back in. We didn't know", he recalled in 2018.

In his second season in 1962, Cross had a career-high five interceptions. He had consecutive Pro Bowl seasons in 1964 and 1965, before he was traded to the Los Angeles Rams for Aaron Martin and Willie Brown in 1966. In 1969, he returned to the Eagles and became a player/coach. Cross retired from play before the 1970 season, becoming a coach for the Eagles. He finished his playing career with 22 interceptions, 14 fumble recoveries, eight forced fumbles, and two defensive touchdowns. He was inducted into the Indiana Football Hall of Fame.

During his playing career, Cross did drive-time sports reports on WIBG (now WNTP) before doing weekend sports on KYW-TV. He was the first black person to do TV sports reports in Philadelphia.

After football
Cross became an analyst and commentator for CBS Sports in 1971, when he became the first African American to work as a sports analyst on national television. In 1975, he teamed with Musburger and Phyllis George on The NFL Today and became the first African American to co-anchor a network sports program. The show was the pregame model all networks used thereafter. Previously, pregame shows were less prestigious than their postgame counterparts, which featured all the Sunday highlights. Cross co-hosted The NFL Today from its inception through 1989. In 1990, the network revamped the show after firing Musburger in a contract dispute, ending Cross's run on the show. He returned to being a game analyst. In addition to his work on CBS's NFL coverage, Cross called NBA basketball, track and field, and gymnastics at various times for the network. He stayed with CBS through 1994. He did not return to network television. "I didn't have an agent, and I didn't search for a TV position as aggressively as I should have", he said in 1996.

Cross served as athletic director at Idaho State University from 1996 to 1998. He then was the director of athletics at Macalester College in Saint Paul, Minnesota, for six years  until June 2005. He was the CEO of Big Brothers Big Sisters of Central Minnesota until May 2010, and returned to football commentary for the Twin Cities' Fox station KMSP-TV.

Cross was the 2009 recipient of the Pete Rozelle Radio-Television Award – the award, given annually by the Pro Football Hall of Fame, recognizes "long-time exceptional contributions to radio and television in professional football." He was the first black person to receive the award.

Personal life
Cross had two daughters from a first marriage and two children with his second wife Elizabeth. He was diagnosed with a mild form of dementia in 2018. He suspected that the condition, along with his headaches, neck pain, and backaches, was a result of chronic traumatic encephalopathy (CTE) caused by the concussions that he had suffered during his playing career. He arranged to have his brain donated to the Boston University CTE Center after his death.

Cross died on February 28, 2021, aged 81, at a hospice in North Oaks, Minnesota, near his home in Roseville. His cause of death was heart disease (ischemic cardiomyopathy).

Publications

References

External links

1939 births
2021 deaths
African-American players of American football
American football cornerbacks
American television reporters and correspondents
American television sports announcers
College football announcers
Eastern Conference Pro Bowl players
Gymnastics broadcasters
Idaho State Bengals athletic directors
Los Angeles Rams players
Macalester Scots athletic directors
National Basketball Association broadcasters
National Football League announcers
Northwestern University School of Education and Social Policy alumni
Northwestern Wildcats football players
People from Roseville, Minnesota
People with dementia
Pete Rozelle Radio-Television Award recipients
Philadelphia Eagles players
Players of American football from Indiana
Sportspeople from Hammond, Indiana
Track and field broadcasters
20th-century African-American sportspeople
21st-century African-American people
Deaths from cardiomyopathy